Girindrasekhar Bose (31 January 1887 – 3 June 1953) was an early 20th-century Indian psychoanalyst, the first president (1922–1953) of the Indian Psychoanalytic Society. Bose carried on a twenty-year dialogue with Sigmund Freud. Known for disputing the specifics of Freud's Oedipal theory, he has been pointed to by some as an early example of non-Western contestations of Western methodologies. Apart from this, he also started the first general hospital psychiatry unit (GHPU) in Asia at the R.G. Kar Medical College, Calcutta in 1933.

Life and work
Bose's doctoral thesis, Concept of Repression (1921) blended Hindu thought with Freudian concepts. He sent the thesis to Freud, which led to a correspondence between the two men and to the formation of the Indian Psychoanalytic Society in 1922 in Calcutta. Of the fifteen original members, nine were college teachers of psychology or philosophy and five belonged to the medical corps of the Indian Army, including two British psychiatrists. One of them was Owen A.R. Berkeley Hill, famous for his work at the Ranchi Mental Hospital. In the same year, Bose wrote to Freud in Vienna. Freud was pleased that his ideas had spread to such a far-off land and asked Bose to write to Ernest Jones, then President of the International Psychoanalytic Association, for membership of that body. Bose did so and the Indian Psychoanalytic Society, with Bose as president (a position he held until his death in 1953) became a full-fledged member of the international psychoanalytic community. The review of the Indian Psychoanalytic Society is called Samiksha and its first edition appeared in 1947.

Works

 Concept of Repression. By Girindrashekhar Bose. Published by G. Bose, 14 Parsi Bagan, Calcutta, India. 1921. 223 pp. Rs. 10/ net.
 (with Ernest Jones and others) Glossary for the use of translators of psycho-analytic works, 1926

Bose, Girindrasekhar. (1933). "A New Theory of Mental Life". Indian Journal of Psychology, 37-157.

Notes

References
Hartnack, Christiane. (1990). "Vishnu on Freud's Desk:Psychoanalysis in Colonial India". Social Research, 57 (4), 921-949.
Hartnack, Christiane. (2003). "Freud on Garuda's Wings - Psychoanalysis in Colonial India". IIAS Newsletter #30, March 2003
Indian Psychoanalytical Society. (1955). Samiksa Special Issue on Bose.

Kakar, Sudhir. (1997). "Encounters of the psychological kind: Freud, Jung and India" in Culture and Psyche: Psychoanalysis and India. New York, Psyche Press.

Nandy, Ashis. 'The savage Freud: the first non-Western psychoanalyst and the politics of secret selves in colonial India', in The savage Freud and other essays on possible and retrievable selves, Princeton University Press, 1995, pp. 81–144

Further reading
T.G. Vaidyanathan & Jeffrey J. Kripal (editors): Vishnu on Freud's Desk: A Reader in Psychoanalysis and Hinduism, Oxford University Press , Paperback (Edition: 2003)
Amit Ranjan Basu,"Girindrasekhar Basu and the coming of psychology in colonial India," Theoretical Perspective, Vol.6, 1999, pp. 26–55.
Amit Ranjan Basu, "Emergence of a Marginal Science in a Colonial City: Reading Psychiatry in Bengali Periodicals." Indian Economic and Social History Review, 41, 2004, pp 103–141.
Amit Ranjan Basu, "Historicizing Indian psychiatry" Indian Journal of Psychiatry, Vol. 47, No. 2, 2005, pp. 126–129.
 Amit Ranjan Basu, The Coming of Psychoanalysis in Colonial India: the Bengali Writings of Dr. Girindrasekhar Bose, No. 5, 1999 (Centre for Studies in Social Sciences), Enreca Occasional Paper Series - Cu[l]ture and the Disciplines: Papers from the Cultural Studies Workshops/Tapti Guha Thakurta (35.54 p.)
Christopher Harding, ‘The Freud Franchise: Independence of Mind in India and Japan’, in R. Clarke (ed), Celebrity and Colonialism: Fame, Power and Representation in (Post) Colonial Cultures (Cambridge Scholars Press, 2009).
Christopher Harding, 'Freud in Asia'. BBC Radio 3 documentary, broadcast 16 November 2014. http://www.bbc.co.uk/programmes/b04p51zy

External links
Biography
Bose-Freud correspondence.
About IPA, see "How did the IPA begin?"
Books by Girindrasekhar Bose

1880s births
1953 deaths
Psychoanalysts
Indian psychiatrists
University of Calcutta alumni
Academic staff of the University of Calcutta
20th-century Indian medical doctors
Bengali scientists
Medical doctors from Kolkata